O'Brien's Bridge or O'Briensbridge is a village in east County Clare, Ireland, on the west bank of the River Shannon, in a civil parish of the same name. It is named for the bridge across the Shannon at that point, built by Turlough O'Brien in 1506.

Location

The parish of O'Briensbridge, which includes the village of O'Brien's Bridge, is in the barony of Tulla Lower. 
It was formerly part of the parish of Killaloe. 
The parish is bounded on the east by the River Shannon.
There were two castles in the parish. The one at the village of O’Brien’s Bridge was inhabited by Murtagh O’Brien, Baron of Inchiquin, in 1580. It is now entirely gone. The other, Aherinagh, was still reasonably well preserved at the end of the 19th century. In 1580 it belonged to Donogh, son of Conor MacNamara.

History
 
The first bridge across the river here was built in 1506 by Turlough O'Brien, first Earl of Thomond and his brother, the Bishop of Killaloe.
This first bridge was made of wood, and was burned in 1510 by Gearóid Mór FitzGerald, 8th Earl of Kildare.
This bridge was destroyed in 1537 by Leonard Grey, the Lord Deputy of Ireland under King Henry VIII of England, after an extended battle against the O'Briens, who had rebelled. A 12-arch stone bridge was built next. It was replaced around 1750, partially replaced in 1842, and modified to include a navigation arch in the 1920s.

At the eastern end of today's 12-arch bridge lies the village of Montpelier in County Limerick.

The ancient river-crossing here is believed to be identical with Áth Caille (meaning "Ford of the Wood"): one of the three fords mentioned in the Triads of Ireland, the others being Áth Clíath (Dublin) and Áth Lúain (Athlone).

Sports

The local soccer club is Bridge Celtic AFC, which was formed in 1963 and currently plays in the Clare Soccer League. The club won the Clare Premier title in 2006/07, for the first time in 28 years.

Townlands

The parish contains the townlands of  Aharinaghmore, Ardataggle, Ballybrack, Ballycar North, Ballycar South, Ballyknavin, Cappakea, Carrownagowan, Cloghera, Clonboy, Coolnalira, Coumbrack, Earlhill, Fahy Beg, Fahy More North, Fahy More South, Glenlon North, Glenlon South, Kilcredaun, Kilroughil, Knockaderreen, Knockdonagh, Lackareagh Beg, Lackareagh More, Magherareagh, O'Briensbridge, Ross, Roo East, Roo West and Trough.

See also
 List of towns and villages in Ireland
 Montpelier, County Limerick
 O'Briensbridge-Montpelier
 O'Brien's Bridge (now Glenorchy, Tasmania)

References
Citations

Sources

 

Towns and villages in County Clare
River Shannon
Civil parishes of County Clare